Beauty Without Cruelty (BWC) is an animal issues charity in South Africa, established in 1975. Its initial focus was animal testing, fur and ivory. It has subsequently expanded to include educating and offering kind options in all areas of animal exploitation. Beauty Without Cruelty is an animal rights organisation with a primary objective to educate and inform the public about the exploitation, abuse and suffering of all animals and to offer humane,  non-animal alternatives, to replace cruel and harmful lifestyle choices. They receive no government or lottery funding and rely entirely on the generosity of supporters to continue work for animals.  Beauty Without Cruelty means living without cruelty.

It is also a British company that manufactures vegan cosmetics. The cosmetics contain no animal products and are not tested on animals.

The company was founded as a charity in 1959 by Lady Muriel Dowding (1908–1993), president of the National Anti-Vivisection Society and wife of Lord Dowding (1882–1970), the former commander-in-chief of RAF Fighter Command. The charity, now known as the BWC Charitable Trust, established branches in Australia, New Zealand, India, South Africa and the United States, and in 1963 Lady Dowding set up Beauty Without Cruelty Cosmetics, which became a private company. According to Dowding, BWC pioneered the production of 100 percent vegetable soap as a luxury item. The brand was introduced into the United States in 1989.

BWC's products are free of parabens, gluten, S.L.S, PEG, toluene, formaldehyde and phthalates. Although millions of animals are killed each year as a result of animal testing of cosmetics, Beauty Without Cruelty advocates animal rights and argues that the results of animal testing are often unreliable and can not being applied to humans. BWC focuses on vegan and "natural" products that cannot chemically harm humans and do not need to be tested on animals.

BWC has worked to support the Humane Cosmetics Act on its mission to end cosmetic animal testing in the United States.

History
After being founded officially in England (1963) by BWC Charitable Trust, BWC began work on its cosmetics line. BWC's goal was to create natural cosmetics that did not contain animal ingredients and had never been tested on animals. Katherine Long, a well known cosmetician and animal welfare activist, worked with Noel Gabriel to lead the organization in creating these products. Muriel Dowding offered her assistance to the organization after Long's death in 1969 to stop it from being shut down. Later in 1978, Joseph Piccioni became the managing director of BWC in Great Britain. With his business expertise and dedication to animal rights, Piccioni helped lead BWC to launch its lines in the United States in 1989.

See also
 List of animal rights advocates
 List of vegetarian and vegan companies
 Testing cosmetics on animals

References

External links
 
 Beauty Without Cruelty full information

1963 establishments in England
Anti-vivisection organizations
Cosmetics companies of the United Kingdom
Chemical companies established in 1963
Veganism in the United Kingdom
Vegetarian companies and establishments of the United Kingdom